Observer officer may refer to:
A rank equivalent to pilot officer for non-pilots in the Royal Air Force, phased out between the World Wars
A rank equivalent to flying officer used in the Royal Observer Corps

Former military ranks of the Royal Air Force